Old Fold Manor Golf Club House, in the London Borough of Barnet, is a grade II listed building.

Old Ford Manor was founded in 1910 by Viscount Enfield.  The Club is believed to built on the battleground of the Battle of Barnet.

References

External links

Grade II listed buildings in the London Borough of Barnet
Monken Hadley